Alexander Zverev was the two-time defending champion, but lost to Cristian Garín in the quarterfinals.

Garín went on to win the title, defeating Matteo Berrettini in the final, 6–1, 3–6, 7–6(7–1).

Seeds
The top four seeds received a bye into the second round.

Draw

Finals

Top half

Bottom half

Qualifying

Seeds

Qualifiers

Qualifying draw

First qualifier

Second qualifier

Third qualifier

Fourth qualifier

References

External links
 Main draw
 Qualifying draw

Singles